The Wurstelprater ( or  being the Viennese name for Hanswurst) is an amusement park and section of the Wiener Prater (a park) in Leopoldstadt, Vienna, Austria.

This institution dates back to the time of the Austrian Empire, when Emperor Joseph II made the Prater (which had been serving as Imperial hunting ground until then) open to the public in 1766. Soon the first snack bars, stalls and bowling alleys opened up on the grounds and the Wurstelprater was born.

The best-known attraction is the Wiener Riesenrad, a Ferris wheel. The park also features various rides, bumper cars, carousels, roller coasters, shooting galleries, ghost trains, a Madame Tussauds wax works cabinet and much more. Apart from the rides, the park features various famous traditional Viennese restaurants (such as the Schweizerhaus and the Walfisch) and souvenir shops.

The mascot for the park is Calafati, a 9 m-tall sculpture of a Chinese man, which stands near the Wiener Riesenrad.

The park is open from 10:00 am to 1:00 am daily in its season, which runs from 15 March to 31 October. Some attractions, as well as the food stands and restaurants, are open throughout the year. There is no entrance fee to get into the park; instead, each attraction charges its own fee, the attractions being individual businesses mostly owned by local families.

During the advent season, a small Christmas Market can be found on Riesenradplatz, right beside the Wiener Riesenrad Ferris Wheel at the Wurstelprater entrance. This Wintermarkt is open from mid-November till beginning of January and features traditional Christmas gifts as well as seasonal food and beverages.

The Wurstelprater is located in the Wiener Prater and can be conveniently reached by public transport (U1/U2 Praterstern) as well as by car (parking facilities available).

References

External links 
prater.at | Your Wurstelprater Guide – park information, rides, restaurants and events
City of Vienna page on the Prater
www.wiener-prater.at

Tourist attractions in Vienna
Amusement parks in Austria
Buildings and structures in Leopoldstadt
1766 establishments in Austria